Pedasanagallu is a village in Krishna district of the Indian state of Andhra Pradesh. It is located in Movva mandal of Machilipatnam revenue division. It is one of the villages in the mandal to be a part of Andhra Pradesh Capital Region.

Surapaneni Family 
Surapaneni is the most common surname in the village. The Surapaneni genealogical tree has been traced up ten generations by two village elders, Yeddanapudi Vithal Venu Gopala Rao and  Sri Surapaneni Venkata Krishna Rao. While Chowdarayya's male line died out, Kistamma's line continued and is the most prominent one today. This Surapaneni family also married into the Cherukuri, Lingam, and Lingamaneni families.

See also 
Villages in Movva mandal

References 

Villages in Krishna district